Cilix  is a small crater on Europa that serves as the reference point for the moon's system of longitude. The longitude of Cilix's center is defined as being 182° W, thus establishing the moon's prime meridian. It is named after Cilix, the brother of Europa

Cilix is about 15 km in diameter.

References

External links 
 Cilix Crater Flyover

Impact craters on Jupiter's moons
Surface features of Europa (moon)